Kylie Jane Babbington (born 13 December 1987) is a British actress best known for her single television role, performing on EastEnders from June 2010 to November 2011.

Babbington was born in Havering, London in 1987. She studied acting and musical theatre at the Italia Conti Academy of Theatre Arts, where she appeared in productions of Assassins, Elergies, Essex Girls and Odin.

In 2010 she was cast in the BBC soap opera EastEnders as Jodie Gold, daughter of Vanessa Gold (Zöe Lucker) and a love interest for Darren Miller (Charlie G. Hawkins). Babbington's character was written out in November 2011.

Awards and nominations

References

External links

Living people
1987 births
People from the London Borough of Havering
English soap opera actresses
Actresses from London
Alumni of the Italia Conti Academy of Theatre Arts